Palermo is a town in Waldo County, Maine, United States. The population was 1,570 at the 2020 census. Palermo is included in the Augusta, Maine micropolitan New England City and Town Area.

Geography
Other ponds include: Branch Pond (310 acres), Beech Pond (59 acres), Jump Pond (51 acres), Belden Pond (24 acres), Foster (Crotch) Pond (32 acres), Bowler (Belton) Pond (35 acres), Chisholm Pond (42 acres) and Turner Pond (199 acres).

Palermo is bordered by Albion and Freedom to the north, Montville and Liberty to the east, Somerville and Washington to the south and China to the west. The town is served by Route 3.

Demographics

2010 census
As of the census of 2010, there were 1,535 people, 623 households, and 461 families living in the town. The racial makeup of the town was 97.5% White, 0.5% African American, 0.4% Native American, 0.5% Asian, 0.1% from other races, and 1.1% from two or more races. Hispanic or Latino of any race were 0.5% of the population.

There were 623 households, of which 30.8% had children under the age of 18 living with them, 58.6% were married couples living together, 10.6% had a female householder with no husband present, 4.8% had a male householder with no wife present, and 26.0% were non-families. 19.3% of all households were made up of individuals, and 8.2% had someone living alone who was 65 years of age or older. The average household size was 2.46 and the average family size was 2.78.

The median age in the town was 43.8 years. 22.5% of residents were under the age of 18; 7% were between the ages of 18 and 24; 22% were from 25 to 44; 32.7% were from 45 to 64; and 15.8% were 65 years of age or older. The gender makeup of the town was 49.7% male and 50.3% female.

2000 census
As of the census of 2000, there were 1,220 people, 491 households, and 363 families living in the town. There were 789 housing units at an average density of 19.5 per square mile (7.5/km). The racial makeup of the town was 97.70% White, 0.33% African American, 0.41% Native American, 0.33% Asian, and 1.23% from two or more races. Hispanic or Latino of any race were 0.25% of the population.

There were 491 households, out of which 29.1% had children under the age of 18 living with them, 62.1% were married couples living together, 7.1% had a female householder with no husband present, and 25.9% were non-families. 20.0% of all households were made up of individuals, and 5.5% had someone living alone who was 65 years of age or older.  The average household size was 2.48 and the average family size was 2.84.

In the town, the population was spread out, with 24.5% under the age of 18, 4.5% from 18 to 24, 30.3% from 25 to 44, 28.0% from 45 to 64, and 12.7% who were 65 years of age or older.  The median age was 40 years. For every 100 females, there were 101.7 males.  For every 100 females age 18 and over, there were 105.6 males.

The median income for a household in the town was $34,375, and the median income for a family was $37,431. Males had a median income of $29,464 versus $23,365 for females. The per capita income for the town was $17,827.  About 15.6% of families and 18.2% of the population were below the poverty line, including 26.0% of those under age 18 and 7.9% of those age 65 or over.

Education

Palermo is part of the Sheepscot Valley Regional School Unit.

The school district's website is http://www.svrsu.org/.

Palermo's elementary school (K–8th) is Palermo Consolidated School. This school usually has about 140 students.

Most children from Palermo Consolidated School continue their education at Erskine Academy in South China, Maine.

Notable people 

 Frank P. Bennett (1853–1933), was an American journalist, magazine publisher and politician who served as a member of the Massachusetts House of Representatives; he married Nancy L. Greeley of Palermo, Maine
 Frank P. Bennett, Jr. (1878–1965), was an American politician, banker, and editor who served in the Massachusetts General Court. Born in Palermo, Maine
 Harry Vaughn Cail (1913–2008), was an American sport shooter. He competed in the 50 m rifle event at the 1948 Summer Olympics. Lived in Palermo
 Martin Greeley (1814–1899), was an American farmer and politician. Born in Palermo, Maine
 Daniel Darwin Pratt (1813–1877), was a United States Senator from Indiana. Born in Palermo, Maine

References

External links
 
 Maine Genealogy: Palermo, Waldo County, Maine

Towns in Waldo County, Maine
Towns in Maine